Under Two Flags is a 1922 American drama film directed by Tod Browning and starring Priscilla Dean. The picture was one of several films based upon the 1867 novel Under Two Flags by Ouida and subsequent stage play version by Arthur Shirley.

Cast
 Priscilla Dean as Cigarette
 James Kirkwood as Cpl. Victor
 John Davidson as Sheik Ben Ali Hammed
 Stuart Holmes as Marquis de Chateauroy (Holmes also appeared in an earlier version of Under Two Flags with Theda Bara)
 Ethel Grey Terry as Princess Corona
 Bobby Mack as Rake (as Robert Mack)
 Burton Law as Sheik's aide
 Albert Pollet as Capt. Tollaire
 W.H. Bainbridge as The Colonel
 Wilberta Almyra Babbidge as Dancer (uncredited)
 Rose Dione as Barmaid (uncredited)

Preservation
The film was delayed for a few days when, on the last day of shooting in 1922, a fire at Universal City destroyed 110,000 feet of the positive copy of the film. The fire was quickly put out and the negative copy of the film was essentially undamaged. During the fire Priscilla Dean, who was still in costume, tripped on some stairs and turned her ankle.

References

External links

1922 films
1922 drama films
Silent American drama films
American silent feature films
American black-and-white films
1920s English-language films
Films directed by Tod Browning
Films based on British novels
Films based on works by Ouida
Films set in deserts
French Foreign Legion in popular culture
Universal Pictures films
1920s American films